Yuquan Campus, is a campus of Zhejiang University. It was the location of former headquarters of the university. Today, it also owns some administrative departments of the university.

Introduction
The campus is urban in Hangzhou City, Zhejiang Province.

The campus is sited on the northwest corner of the West Lake, with the Lingfeng Hill (灵峰) and Laohe Hill (老和山) on its back side and it faces to the Wushi Hill (乌石峰). It's close to the Yuquan historic site (the Jade Spring) and named after it. There is a botany garden aside, which is one of the largest in China.

The campus has a total area of 2044 mu, and a total building area close to one million m2.

Notable buildings
 Sir Run Run Shaw Hall of Science (邵逸伕科學舘 / 邵逸夫科学馆, donated by and named after the Hong Kong media mogul Run Run Shaw.
 Chu Kochen Building of Int'l Education (竺可楨國際教育大樓 / 竺可桢国际教育大楼, named after the former president Coching CHU, a.k.a. CHU Kochen or ZHU Kezhen)

Institutions 

 Faculty of Science (headquartered)
 School of Mathematical Sciences
 Department of Physics
 Department of Chemistry
 School of Earth Sciences

 Faculty of Engineering (headquartered)
 School of Mechanical Engineering 
 School of Material Science and Engineering
 College of Energy Engineering
 College of Electrical Engineering 
 College of Chemical and Biological Engineering
 School of Aeronautics and Astronautics
 Department of Polymer Science and Engineering
 Faculty of Information (headquartered)
 College of Optical Science and Engineering
 College of Information Science and Electronic Engineering
 College of Control Science and Engineering
 College of Computer Science and Technology
 College of Biomedical Engineering and Instrument Science

References

Yuquan Campus, Zhejiang University